Abu Sayeed is a Bangladeshi politician.

Abu Sayeed (also spelled Sayed, Saeed, Sa'eid, Said, Sid, or Sayid) may also refer to:

 Abu Sa‘id al-Khudri, 7th century Ansari
 Abu Said Gorgani, 9th century Persian mathematician
 Abu Sa'id al-Jannabi, 9th century Bahraini monarch
 Abu Sa'id Al-Janadi (died 920), Islamic scholar
 Abū-Sa'īd Abul-Khayr (967-1049), Persian Sufi poet
 Abu Saeed Mubarak Makhzoomi (1013–1119), Iraqi Sufi saint
 Abu Sa'id Gardezi (died 1061), Persian geographer
 Abu Said al-Baji (1156–1231), Tunisian Sufi Wali
 Abu Sa'id Bahadur Khan (1305–1335), Ilkhanate emperor
 Abu Said Uthman III (died 1420), Moroccan Marinid ruler
 Abu Sa'id Mirza (1424–1469), Timurid monarch
 Abu Sayeed Chowdhury (1921–1987), Bangladeshi jurist
 Abdullah Abu Sayeed (born 1939), Bangladeshi television presenter
 Abu Sayed Mohammad Abdul Awal (born 1957), Bangladesh Navy officer 
 Abu Sayeed (film director), Bangladeshi film director
 Abu Sayeed M Ahmed, Bangladeshi architect

Places
 Abu Said, Iran, a village